Bansi is a constituency of the Uttar Pradesh Legislative Assembly covering the city of Bansi in the Siddharth Nagar district of Uttar Pradesh, India.
  
Bansi is one of five assembly constituencies in the Lok Sabha constituency of Domariyaganj. Since 2008, this assembly constituency is numbered 304 amongst 403 constituencies.

Members of Legislative Assembly

Election results

2022

2017

Bharatiya Janta Party candidate Jai Pratap Singh won in 2017 Uttar Pradesh Legislative Elections defeating Samajwadi Party candidate Lal ji by a margin of 18,942 votes.

16th Vidhan Sabha: 2012 General Elections

15th Vidhan Sabha: 2007 General Elections

References

External links
 

Assembly constituencies of Uttar Pradesh
Siddharthnagar district